The Fujitsu FR (Fujitsu RISC) is a 32-bit RISC processor family. New variants include a floating point unit and partly video input analog-to-digital converter and digital signal processor. It is supported by Softune, GNU Compiler Collection and other integrated development environments.

Applications
Fujitsu FR are used to control previous versions of Milbeaut signal processors specialized for image processing. Although variants of the 6th generation in 2011 and later generations changed to dual-core ARM architecture, ASSP/ASIC variants with FR controller are continued.
They are also used as processor cores inside versions 1 to 3 of the Nikon Expeed image processors (versions 3A and 4 have moved to ARM CPUs).

See also
 SPARClite
 FR-V (microprocessor)

References

External links 
 Embedded 32 Bit RISC Solutions from Fujitsu
 32 Bit Family Fujitsu
 
 Green Hills Software Announces Software Development Solution for Fujitsu FR Family

Fujitsu microprocessors
Microcontrollers